Brian McDonald (born 1941) is an Irish retired Gaelic footballer who played for club side Synge Street P.P. ( since 1999 now called Templeogue Synge Street ) and at inter-county level with the Dublin senior football team.

Career

Born in Dublin, McDonald first enjoyed success as a schoolboy with CBS Roscommon, with whom he won Connacht Colleges Championship medal. His performances earned inclusion on the Roscommon minor teams as a dual player, however, he subsequently lined out with the Dublin minor team that won the All-Ireland Championship in 1958 when Mayo were beaten in the final. McDonald won a second successive title from centre-forward the following year before winning an All-Ireland Junior Championship title in 1960. After joining the Dublin senior team, he won Leinster Championship medals in 1963 and 1965. He was a member of the Dublin squad that defeated Galway to win the 1963 All-Ireland final.

Honours

Dublin
All-Ireland Senior Football Championship: 1963
Leinster Senior Football Championship: 1963, 1965
All-Ireland Junior Football Championship: 1960
Leinster Junior Football Championship: 1960
All-Ireland Minor Football Championship: 1958, 1959
Leinster Minor Football Championship: 1958, 1959

References

1941 births
Living people
Roscommon inter-county hurlers
Roscommon inter-county Gaelic footballers
Dublin inter-county Gaelic footballers
Dual players